Cichlidogyrus evikae is a species of monopisthocotylean monogenean in the family Dactylogyridae (or Ancyrocephalidae according to certain classifications). It is a parasite of the gills of the fish Tanganicodus irsacae (Perciforme, Cichlidae) in Lake Tanganyika, Burundi.

Etymology

According to Rahmouni, Vanhove & Šimková, “the name evikae was given in honour of the Czech parasitologist Dr. Eva Řehulková (Department of Botany and Zoology, Faculty of Science, Masaryk University, Czech Republic) who studies monogenean flatworms, for her contributions to their research.”

References

Dactylogyridae
Animals described in 2017